The 2004 British Columbia Scott Tournament of Hearts, British Columbia's women's provincial curling championship, was held January 20–24, 2004 at the Golden Ears Winter Club in Maple Ridge, British Columbia. The winning team of Georgina Wheatcroft represented British Columbia at the 2004 Scott Tournament of Hearts in Red Deer, Alberta, finishing with a record of 4-7

Teams

Standings

Results

Draw 1
January 20, 7:00 PM PT

Draw 2
January 21, 9:00 AM PT

Draw 3
January 21, 2:00 PM PT

Draw 4
January 21, 7:30 PM PT

Draw 5
January 22, 1:00 PM PT

Draw 6
January 22, 7:00 PM PT

Draw 7
January 23, 9:00 AM PT

Playoffs

Semifinal
January 23, 7:30 PM PT

Final
January 24, 2:00 PM PT

References

British Columbia Scott Tournament Of Hearts, 2004
Maple Ridge, British Columbia
2004 in British Columbia
Curling in British Columbia